Saod Abdul-Aziz Al-Kaebari (Arabic:سعود الخيبري)  is a Saudi football defender who played for Saudi Arabia in the 2004 Asian Cup. He also played for Al Ahli and Ettifaq FC.

External links
11v11 Profile

1980 births
2004 AFC Asian Cup players
Living people
Saudi Arabian footballers
Place of birth missing (living people)
Al-Suqoor FC players
Al-Tai FC players
Al-Hazem F.C. players
Ettifaq FC players
Al-Ahli Saudi FC players
Al-Taawoun FC players
Saudi First Division League players
Saudi Professional League players
Association football fullbacks
Saudi Arabia international footballers